We Were Alive! is a live album by folk rock band Angels of Light. It was released in 2002, and contains two songs previously recorded by Swans. It was limited to 750 copies on release.

The earnings from the record sales were used for the production of Angels of Light's next studio release, Everything Is Good Here/Please Come Home. The same funding strategy was subsequently used by Angels of Light frontman Michael Gira's other band Swans in 2012, when the band released their live album, We Rose from Your Bed with the Sun in Our Head to fund their upcoming album The Seer.

Critical reception

Ned Raggett of Allmusic wrote: "The sound quality sometimes results in a distanced overall mix (it combined desk recordings with a live room mic), which often can bury Mullins' quieter drum work to the point of sensing it rather than hearing it. It's unfortunate but not crippling, and in ways actually gives We Were Alive! a weird texture that's worth a listen." Peter Marks of Release Magazine stated: "Delicate interludes in the midst of absolute chaotic cruelty which would make Glenn Branca blush."

Track listing

Personnel
Angels of Light
Michael Gira – vocals, guitar, production

Contributors
Dana Schechter – bass, piano, vocals
Larry Mullins – Farfisa, Marimba Lumina, drums
Thor Harris – vibraphone, hammer dulcimer, autoharp, piano, percussion

References

External links
 We Were Alive! on Young God Records

Angels of Light albums
2002 live albums
Young God Records live albums
Albums produced by Michael Gira
Crowdfunded albums